Bhokardan is a metropolis in the Indian state of Maharashtra and is one the oldest and historical cities in India. Bhokardn was a part of the Hyderabad state until it joined the India union in 1948.in 1960,it became a part of the newly formed state of Maharashtra from the bilingual Bombay state the ruins of the old fortifications are still visible around the city the area of the old fort now houses tehsil offices Bhokardn hasbeen identified by modern historians as the capitel of an ancient district raja Bhogavardhan

Etymology
According to legends, the name Bhokardan is derived from the name of king Bhogvardhan or Bhagdnath, who ruled this city in ancient time. Local legends consider this to be a capital city of  Bhoumasura, a mythological demon, who was killed by Hindu god Shri Krishna.

History
Bhokardan is situated on the bank of Kelana river. Bhokardan has been identified by the modern historians with the ancient city of Bhogavardhana. One of the earliest references of Bhokardan is found in Markandeya Purana, where it is described as a prosperous trading city in Dandakaranya area, located on the trade route from Ujjayini, in central India to Prathishthana, then capital city of Satavahanas. Similar, references were also found in various other ancient literature. In earlier period Bhokardan was a Janapada, which later got status of an independent region. Bhokardan was the third richest city in Satavahana period after Prathishthana and Ter. The inscription records at stupas of Bharhut and Sanchi, mention receiving donations from inhabitants of this city for their construction. There is a reference in an article from 593 AD that, the king of Mahishmati, Raja Shankargan, of Kalachuri dynasty, has donated some land to a Brahmin in Bhogvardan region.  However, the history of this place in the Middle Ages is not known. In later period of Peshwas rule, this city came under control of the Nizam of Hyderabad. Bhokardan was part of Hyderabad State until its annexation into the Indian Union in 1948. In 1960, it became a part of newly form state of Maharashtra from bilingual Bombay state. The ruins of old fortification are still visible around the city; the old fort area now houses the Tehsil office.

Excavation at Bhokardan: An ancient site comprising two mounds, about 70 ft high, was discovered by M. N. Deshpande near Bhokardan in 1958. Subsequently, a joint evacuation was carried away by a combined team of Nagpur University and Marathwada University, in 1973–74, during this evacuation two periods of occupation were identified:

 Period I 
 Period Ia - early Satavahana period
 Period Ib - late Satavahana period
 Period II post Satavahana period.
During the excavations, traces of foundations, brick walls, floors, post-holes, fallen roofs and a ring well were discovered. The artifacts found from the site included punch-marked coins, copper coins of the Satavahanas and the Kshatrapas; a few terracotta bullae with legends in Greek; coin moulds and seals. About 2000 beads made of terracotta, glass, shell and semi-precious stones were also found. A large number of terracotta, iron, copper and ivory objects were found from the site. The other important items found at site compromised: scores of human and animal figurines; ivory and shell bangles; terracotta ear ornaments; saddle querns with Buddhist symbols and burnt grains which compromised wheat, Jowar, gram, ber and rice.

However, the most exquisite of all the find was the lower half of an ivory female figurine, carved in the round with two female attendants. It is reminiscent of the ivory statue of Hindu goddess found at ancient Roman town-city Pompeii near modern Naples in the Italy, which was  destroyed and buried under ash and pumice in the eruption of Mount Vesuvius in 79 AD. Numbers of scholars have argued that the ivory statue of Pompeii had its origin at Bhokardan, which found its way either through ancient caravan based silk route or via ship based spice route to Pompeii in the first century AD. Similar ivory objects were also found at Ter. This statues serves as a testimonial of trade relationships of the ancient world.
 
During Satavahanas' period Bhokardan was a center for ivory artifacts, which were traded for other items. After the decline of the Satavahanas, Bhokardan lost its importance as a major trade center, leading to its downfall. It seems to have been re-occupied only in medieval period.

The ivory female statue and number of other artifacts which were found during excavation are now preserved and displayed at the history museum, of department of History & Ancient Indian Culture, of Dr. Babasaheb Ambedkar Marathwada University, Aurangabad.

Geography
It has an average elevation of 587 metres (1925 feet). The old city lies on small hills on the south bank of Kelana river. Over the last few decades, city has expanded and continue to grow southwards, towards the road to Jalna.

Demographics
 India census, Bhokardan had a population of 70,416. Males constitute 35751 of the population and females 34665. Population of Children with age of 0-6 is 3767 which is 15.43% of total population of Bhokardan (M Cl). Female Sex Ratio is of 915 against state average of 929. Moreover, Child Sex Ratio in Bhokardan is around 859 compared to Maharashtra state average of 894. Literacy rate of Bhokardan city is 81.96% lower than state average of 82.34%. In Bhokardan, Male literacy is around 88.66% while female literacy rate is 74.72%.

Government 

Bhokardan (constituency number 103) is one of the five Vidhan Sabha constituencies located in Jalna district and is the seat for the Member of the legislative assembly. It covers the entire Jafrabad taluka and part of Bhokardan tehsil of this district. Current MLA for Bhokardan constituency is Santosh Danve of Bhartiya Janta Party, son of Raosaheb Danve.

Bhokardan is part of Jalna Lok Sabha Constituency.

Economy
Weekly market of Bhokardan is on Saturday of every week .

Gallery

See also
 Bhokardan (Vidhan Sabha constituency)

References

Further reading
 Deo, S. B. and R. S. Gupte (eds.) (1974). Excavations at Bhokardan (Bhogavardhana), Nagpur: Nagpur University

Cities and towns in Jalna district
Talukas in Maharashtra